Lagkada (Greek: Λαγκάδα) may refer to several places in Greece:

Lagkada, Chios, a village in the island of Chios 
Lagkada, Ioannina, a village in the Ioannina regional unit
Lagkada, Itanos, a village in Lasithi, municipality Itanos
Lagkada, Makrys Gialos, a village in Lasithi, municipality Makrys Gialos
Lagkada, Messenia, a village in Messenia
Lagkadas, a municipality in the Thessaloniki regional unit
Loutra Lagkadas, a village and a thermal spring in the Thessaloniki regional unit
Lake Lagkada, a lake in Greece

See also

Lagkadia (disambiguation)